The Mormon Trail Monument was designated a California Historic Landmark (No.577). The   Monument is to remember the 500 Mormon pioneers came to the San Bernardino Valley in June 1851. The Monument is near Phelan, California in San Bernardino County, California.  The Monument was built in 1937 and is on California State Route 138, 3.6 Miles West of Interstate 15. In 1857 about half the Mormons were told to return to Utah during the Mormon War, also call the Utah War. the Mormon War, or the Mormon Rebellion

Mormon Lumber Road was built in 1852 up Waterman Canyon in San Bernardino County ending near Crestline, California. The Mormon Lumber Road was designated a California Historic Landmark (No.96) on March 29, 1933. The Landmark Monument was built on the side of the road in 1991. Most of the labor to build the road came from Mormon volunteers. At the top of the road they built 6 saw mills in 1854. The timber was brought down the San Bernardino Mountains to help build the City of San Bernardino, California and Southern California. Timber was sometimes called "Mormon Banknotes". The marker is in Waterman Canyon on California State Route 18, 0.5 miles West of Crestline, California
Mormon Stockade is the site of the first home in San Bernardino, built by Jose del Carmen Lugo in 1839. Jose del Carmen Lugo was a part owner of Rancho San Bernardino. Jose Lugo was born in 1813 in Pueblo de Los Angeles, in Spanish colonial Alta California, then a province of the Viceroyalty of New Spain. José del Carmen Lugo was the eldest son of Antonio Maria Lugo. José del Carmen Lugo, in a joint venture with his brothers José María and Vicente Lugo and cousin Diego Sepúlveda, began colonizing the San Bernardino Valley and adjacent Yucaipa Valley. Their colony charter was approved by the Mexican government in 1839. The valley was plagued by robberies and frequent raids by California indians resisting loss of their homeland. Many would-be colonizers would stay for only short periods of time. The Lugo families became strong allies with the Mountain Band of Cahuilla Indians led by Chief Juan Antonio.
The site is also the site of fort stockade built in 1851. The fort stockade was built by pioneers families for protection from Native Californians. Over 100 California pioneers lived in the fort stockade for a year. The Jose del Carmen Lugo home and Mormon Stockade site was designated a California Historic Landmark (No.44) on August 1, 1932. The Landmark Monument was built on the side of the road in 1927. The Monument is at 351 North Arrowhead Avenue, San Bernardino, California, at the San Bernardino County Courthouse.

See also
California Historical Landmarks in San Bernardino County, California
Mormon Trail Illinois to Salt Lake City.
Santa Fe And Salt Lake Trail Monument

References

1851 in California
California Historical Landmarks
History of San Bernardino, California